Beautiful & Twisted, also known as The Novack Murders is a 2015 American made-for-television crime drama film that premiered on Lifetime on January 31, 2015. The film stars Rob Lowe, Paz Vega, Seychelle Gabriel, Michelle Hurd & Candice Bergen. It is based upon the heavily publicized 2009 murders of Bernice Novack and her son, Ben Novack Jr.

Plot
Millionaire and Fontainebleau Miami Beach hotel heir Benji 'Ben' Novack, Jr. (Lowe) marries a stunning stripper, Narcisa 'Narcy' Véliz Pacheco (Vega). But their kinky-infested relationship, soon becomes tarnished by a sea of love and distrust. When Ben's mother, Bernice Novack (Bergen), is found dead in her home in Fort Lauderdale, Florida, her death is ruled out as an accidental fall. Ben’s suspicions surrounding Narcy lead to his demise at the hands of his ruthless wife. As police untangle a web of deviant behavior, Narcy emerges as the prime suspect, and her conviction for orchestrating the murders of both of her husband and mother-in-law soon follows.

Cast
 Rob Lowe as Benji 'Ben' Novack Jr.
Zachary Rifkin as Young Ben
 Paz Vega as Narcisa 'Narcy' Véliz Pacheco-Novack
 Candice Bergen as Bernice Novack
Sharisse Baker-Benard as Young Bernice
 Seychelle Gabriel as May
Soni Bringas as Young May
 Michelle Hurd as Det. Sgt. Gloria Mosley

References

External links

About The Novack Murders

2015 television films
2015 films
2015 crime drama films
American crime drama films
Crime films based on actual events
Lifetime (TV network) films
American drama television films
2010s American films